Baroness Wilcox may refer to:

 Judith Wilcox, Baroness Wilcox of Plymouth (born 1939), British businesswoman
 Debbie Wilcox, Baroness Wilcox of Newport (born 1969), Welsh councillor and teacher